Vombatid gammaherpesvirus 1 (VoHV-1) is a species of virus in the genus Manticavirus, subfamily Gammaherpesvirinae, family Herpesviridae, and order Herpesvirales.

Host 

It is hosted by the common wombat (Vombatus ursinus).

References 

Gammaherpesvirinae